James R. Lites (born 1953 in Pentwater, Michigan) is an American sports executive who currently serves as CEO and alternate governor of the Dallas Stars of the NHL. He was formerly the president of Hicks Sports Marketing Group, and as such was president of the Stars and Texas Rangers of Major League Baseball, both of which were holdings of Tom Hicks, from 1993 to 2002 and from 2003 to 2007. Lites was briefly President and COO of the Phoenix Coyotes from March through December 2002. He was brought back as president and CEO of the Stars on November 18, 2011 when the club was sold to Tom Gaglardi. He has since yielded the presidency to Brad Alberts, but is still operating head of the franchise. Lites had previously served as an executive in the front office of the Detroit Red Wings during the 1980s.

Biography
Lites graduated from the University of Michigan with a bachelor of arts degree in 1975 and graduated cum laude from Wayne State University Law School in 1978. When he practiced law, he specialized in litigation and labor contract negotiations.

Hicks Sports Marketing Group
The Dallas Stars had a mediocre start to the 2007–2008 NHL season, initially going 7–7–3. On November 10, 2007, after a meltdown by the team in Los Angeles (losing 6–5 in OT after leading 4–0 with 7 minutes remaining in the game), Lites dismissed General Manager Doug Armstrong, and replaced him with the tandem of Brett Hull and Les Jackson.

The next day, team owner and chairman Tom Hicks reassigned Lites to head Hicks Sports Marketing Group. Lites oversees the sponsorship and marketing of the Dallas Stars and did so for Texas Rangers, Liverpool Football Club and Mesquite Championship Rodeo until they were sold.

Controversial comments
On December 28, 2018, while serving as CEO of the Dallas Stars, Lites made detrimental and controversial comments to The Athletic regarding two of the team's star players, Tyler Seguin and Jamie Benn. In reference to the duo, Lites was quoted as saying "They are fucking horse-shit, I don’t know how else to put it," singling out the pair after a 2 - 0 Dallas win over the Nashville Predators a day earlier. The comments were made during an invitation-only Q&A session with the media which Lites allegedly convened strictly for the purpose of publicly berating Seguin and Benn. During the same session, Lites also urged the local sports media to rip the players as well.

Benn responded by telling the media "When there is a situation within the organization, I try to keep it within the organization and deal with it face to face", adding "I don't play for (Lites). I play for every player in this room, the coaching staff." On December 30, 2018, the NHLPA commented on the issue in a press release, referring to Lites' comments as "reckless and insulting" and "unprofessional" while adding that "In professional sports, all individual players and teams go through highs and lows, but this is not how professionals handle adversity."

At the time, the Stars sat fourth in the NHL's Central Division with a 19-16-3 record.

References

External links
Jim Lites' Dallas Stars Biography

1954 births
American lawyers
Arizona Coyotes executives
Dallas Stars executives
Detroit Red Wings executives
Living people
Major League Baseball team presidents
Major League Baseball executives
National Hockey League team presidents
People from Oceana County, Michigan
Stanley Cup champions
Texas Rangers executives
University of Michigan alumni
Wayne State University Law School alumni
American chief executives of professional sports organizations